Kevin Sloan is a retired American soccer player who played professionally in the American Soccer League, American Professional Soccer League and Major Indoor Soccer League.  He has also coached professionally and is the former head coach of the Neumann College men's soccer team. Kevin took on a bigger role in 2015, when he resigned from Neumann to take on a new challenge as a scout for Manchester City

Player

Youth
Sloan graduated from Oakland Mills High School.  He then attended Catawba College where he was a 1986 Second Team and a 1985 and 1987 First Team NAIA All American soccer player.  He holds the record for career goals with 56 and was inducted into the Catawba Athletic Hall of Fame in 2010.

Professional
In June 1988, the Chicago Sting selected Sloan in the first round of the Major Indoor Soccer League draft.  When the Sting folded a few weeks later, the Cleveland Force received the rights to Sloan, but did not sign him.  By that time, Sloan was playing for the Maryland Bays of the American Soccer League.  On October 19, 1988, Sloan signed with the Dayton Dynamo of the American Indoor Soccer Association.  He returned to the Bays for the 1989 summer season.  In 1990, the ASL merged with the Western Soccer League to form the American Professional Soccer League.  Sloan and his team mates took the APSL's inaugural championship.  In October 1991, he returned to the indoor game, this time with the Baltimore Blast of the Major Soccer League.  On February 25, 1992, Sloan signed with the Tampa Bay Rowdies.  In October 1992, he rejoined the Dayton Dynamo, now playing in the National Professional Soccer League.  Sloan played two seasons with the Dynamo.  In September 1994, the Dynamo traded Sloan and Joe Mallia to the Baltimore Spirit in exchange for Rob Ukrop and Clark Brisson.  In 1995, he played for the Delaware Wizards of the USISL.  In 1996, he played a single season with the Carolina Dynamo.  In September 1996, Sloan signed with the Sacramento Knights late in the Continental Indoor Soccer League season as the team struggled with injuries.  That fall, he moved to the Philadelphia KiXX of the NPSL.  He remained with the KiXX until 2007.  In addition to playing for the KiXX, he spent the 1998 and 1999 outdoor summer seasons with the Staten Island Vipers of the USISL.  In July 2007, the New Jersey Ironmen selected Sloan in the Major Indoor Soccer League draft.  He spent a season with the Ironmen as a player-assistant coach.

Futsal
In 2003, Sloan played for the United States national futsal team.

Coach
Sloan served as an assistant coach at Philadelphia University.  In 2004, he became an assistant coach with the Philadelphia KiXX.  In 2006, Sloan became the head coach of Neumann College.

References 

1965 births
Living people
American Indoor Soccer Association players
American men's futsal players
American Professional Soccer League players
American soccer coaches
American soccer players
American Soccer League (1988–89) players
Baltimore Blast (1980–1992) players
Baltimore Spirit players
Continental Indoor Soccer League players
Dayton Dynamo players
Delaware Wizards players
Major Indoor Soccer League (2001–2008) coaches
Major Indoor Soccer League (1978–1992) players
Major Indoor Soccer League (2001–2008) players
National Professional Soccer League (1984–2001) coaches
National Professional Soccer League (1984–2001) players
Neumann University
New Jersey Ironmen (MISL) players
New Jersey Stallions players
Philadelphia KiXX players
Sacramento Knights players
Staten Island Vipers players
Soccer players from Maryland
Tampa Bay Rowdies (1975–1993) players
USISL players
People from Mount Airy, Maryland
Association football forwards
Association football midfielders